The 2011–12 Algerian Ligue Professionnelle 2 is the second season of the league under its current title and current league division format. This is the forty-eighth season of second-division football since its establishment in 1962. A total of 16 teams are to contest in the league. The league started on 9 September 2010 and is scheduled to conclude on 17 May 2012.

Changes from last season

Team changes

From Ligue Professionnelle 2
Promoted to Ligue 1
 CA Batna
 CS Constantine
 NA Hussein Dey

Relegated to Ligue Nationale
 CR Témouchent
 JSM Skikda

To Ligue Professionnelle 2
Relegated from Ligue 1
 CA Bordj Bou Arreridj
 USM Annaba
 USM Blida

Promoted from Ligue Nationale
 JS Saoura
 MO Béjaïa

Team overview

Stadia and locations

Managerial changes

League table

Results

Season statistics

Top scorers

Top assistants

See also
 2011–12 Algerian Cup
 2011–12 Algerian Ligue Professionnelle 1
 2011–12 Ligue Nationale Amateur

References

Algerian Ligue 2 seasons
2011–12 in Algerian football leagues
Algeria